Pierce H. Deamer Jr. (April 24, 1907 – June 12, 1986) was an American Republican Party politician who served in both houses of the New Jersey Legislature, serving in the New Jersey General Assembly from 1952 to 1962 and then in the New Jersey Senate until 1966.

Early life
Deamer was born on April 24, 1907 in New York City, the son of Pierce H. Deamer and Adelaide Bernhardt Deamer. His father was a national labor organizer and served as Vice President of the Upholsterers International Union. He moved to Bergenfield, New Jersey in his youth and graduated from Tenafly High School and the New Jersey Law School (now Rutgers School of Law–Newark). He maintained law offices in Bergenfield, where he served as the Bergenfield Municipal Judge and as Chairman of the Bergenfield Civil Defense. He was Municipal Attorney for Bergenfield and New Milford.  He was counsel to the Bergen County Sheriff from 1948-51.

New Jersey General Assembly
He was elected to the New Jersey General Assembly in 1951, and was re-elected in 1953, 1955, 1957 and 1959.

New Jersey State Senate
He was elected to the New Jersey Senate in 1961, defeating Paramus Mayor Fred C. Galda 160,125 (55.8%) to 124,492 (43.4%).

The U.S. Supreme Court, in Reynolds v. Sims (more commonly known as One Man, One Vote), required redistricting by state legislatures for congressional districts to keep represented populations equal, as well as requiring both houses of state legislatures to have districts drawn that contained roughly equal populations, and to perform redistricting when needed.  Because of its population, Bergen County gained three Senate seats.

A deep split among Bergen County Republicans intensified in 1963 when Deamer and former State Senator Walter H. Jones faced off in an election for Bergen County Republican Chairman.  Jones won, and by 1965, Deamer found himself dumped from the Bergen County Republican Organization line.  Jones backed Assembly Speaker Marion West Higgins, Assemblyman Peter Moraites, and former Assemblymen Nelson G. Gross and Arthur Vervaet.  Deamer ran on an insurgent ticket with Assemblymen Richard Vander Plaat and Harry Randall, Jr., and former Assemblyman Carmine Savino.  Jones' slate won decisively.

1965 Republican primary for State Senator - Bergen County

Family and death
He married Agnes M. Churchill of Teaneck on January 4, 1939 and had four children.  Deamer died on June 12, 1986, in Bergenfield.

References

Republican Party New Jersey state senators
Republican Party members of the New Jersey General Assembly
New Jersey state court judges
New Jersey lawyers
Politicians from Bergen County, New Jersey
Rutgers School of Law–Newark alumni
Tenafly High School alumni
People from Bergenfield, New Jersey
1907 births
1986 deaths
20th-century American judges
20th-century American politicians
20th-century American lawyers